The Mové, also called Movere, Western Guaymi, or Ngäbere, are a Chibchan (Dorasque-Guaymi) speaking people in Panama (150,000) and Costa Rica (4,300). This tribe, like the Murire (Eastern Guaymi), is a division of the Guaymi. They are further subdivided into the Valiente.

The Mové live in the rainforest as hunters and gatherers of wild plants. Among their crafts are basket weaving and pottery.

References
1971 Ngawbe: Tradition and Change Among the Western Guaymi of Panama. Illinois Studies in Anthropology No. 7. Urbana: U. of Illinois Press. 
1968 The Ngawbe: An Analysis of the Economy and Social Structure of the Western Guaymi of Panama. Doctoral Dissertation, Department of Anthropology, University of Illinois at Urbana-Champaign. Ann Arbor: University Microfilms International. 
1976 Edabali: The Ritual Sibling Relationship among the Western Guaymi (with J. R. Bort). In P. D. Young and J. Howe, eds., Ritual and Symbol in Native Central America, pp. 77–90. University of Oregon Anthropological Papers, No. 9. Eugene: University of Oregon Press.

Indigenous peoples in Costa Rica
Indigenous peoples in Panama